Capital Preparatory Charter High School was a charter public high school located in Trenton, New Jersey, that served students in ninth through twelfth grades from Trenton and Ewing Township. The school, which opened in August 2008, was shuttered in June 2011 in the wake of issues with its financial operations.

An audit conducted by the New Jersey Department of Education's Office of Fiscal Accountability and Compliance found a $300,000 deficit, among other issues, and the school surrendered its charter in May 2011 after two 90-day probationary periods and will close at the conclusion of the 2010-11 school year.

As of the 2010-11 school year, the school had an enrollment of 304 students and 19.0 classroom teachers (on an FTE basis), for a student–teacher ratio of 16.00:1. There were 187 students (61.5% of enrollment) eligible for free lunch and 22 (7.2% of students) eligible for reduced-cost lunch.

References

External links
 Capital Preparatory Charter High School
 Capital Preparatory Charter High School, National Center for Education Statistics

Ewing Township, New Jersey
2008 establishments in New Jersey
2011 disestablishments in New Jersey
Charter schools in New Jersey
Educational institutions disestablished in 2011
Educational institutions established in 2008
High schools in Trenton, New Jersey
Public high schools in Mercer County, New Jersey